Gustav, Gustaf or Gustave may refer to:
Gustav (name), a male given name of Old Swedish origin

Art, entertainment, and media
Primeval (film), a 2007 American horror film
Gustav (film series), a Hungarian series of animated short cartoons
Gustav (Zoids), a transportation mecha in the Zoids fictional universe
Gustav, a character in Sesamstraße
Monsieur Gustav H., a leading character in The Grand Budapest Hotel

Weapons
Carl Gustav recoilless rifle, dubbed "the Gustav" by US soldiers
Schwerer Gustav, 800-mm German siege cannon used during World War II

Other uses
Gustav (pigeon), a pigeon of the RAF pigeon service in WWII
Gustave (crocodile), a large male Nile crocodile in Burundi
Gustave, South Dakota
Hurricane Gustav (disambiguation), a name used for several tropical cyclones and storms
Gustav, a streetwear clothing brand

See also
Gustav of Sweden (disambiguation)
Gustav Adolf (disambiguation)
Gustave Eiffel (disambiguation)

Gustavo (disambiguation)
Gustavs (name)
Gustavsen
Gustavus (disambiguation)
Gustafson, also Gustafsson, Gustavson, or Gustavsson
Gustaw, Afghanistan